Tyson Coy Stewart (born June 24, 1998) is an American actor, rapper, and singer. He had a role in the TBS sitcom Are We There Yet? as Kevin Kingston-Persons, taking Philip Bolden's place, as Flint in the ABC superhero drama series Agents of S.H.I.E.L.D., Marcus in the PBS Kids Go series The Electric Company, Troy in the Nickelodeon sitcom Bella and the Bulldogs and Lorenzo in Netflix sitcom Mr. Iglesias.
He voiced Benson in the Netflix animated series Kipo and the Age of Wonderbeasts.

Early life
Stewart was born in Columbia, South Carolina. His interest in acting began after reciting lines from popular television series. He then joined a talent agency in Columbia, DeAbreu Modeling and Consulting, before playing Travis Younger in a stage production of A Raisin in the Sun.

Career
In 2010, Stewart began his career with his role as Kevin Kingston in the TBS sitcom Are We There Yet?. In March 2011, Coy won the Young Artists Award for Best Supporting Young Actor in a Comedy or Drama for his role as Kevin in Are We There Yet?. In 2011, on the  PBS Kids Go! he is best known for, playing the role as Marcus Barnes on the Sesame Workshop comedy sitcom, The Electric Company

In, January 2012, Coy's father, Derek Stewart, published a non-fiction book titled The Unlikely Journey that chronicles Coy's journey into the entertainment business.

He played the role of Troy Dixon in the Nickelodeon series Bella and the Bulldogs. He starred as Xavier in the 2016 comedy horror web series WTH: Welcome to Howler. In August 2017, Coy Stewart played the primary role in the music video and short film of the song "1-800-273-8255" by rapper Logic which deals with the issues of homosexuality and suicide. In November 2017, it was announced that Stewart had been cast in Agents of S.H.I.E.L.D. as a young Inhuman called Flint. In late 2018, Stewart was cast in a recurring role on the Netflix sitcom Mr. Iglesias.

Stewart, along with friend Tyrel Jackson Williams and girlfriend Jadagrace, formed the music collective "Grouptherapy" (stylized as "grouptherapy."). On April 1, 2020, the collective released their debut EP entitled this is not the album. The collective later released their debut mixtape, there goes the neighborhood. October 30, 2020.

Filmography

References

External links
 Stewart's page on his family's website
 

1998 births
Living people
21st-century American male actors
African-American male actors
African-American male child actors
American male child actors
American male film actors
American male stage actors
American male television actors
Male actors from Columbia, South Carolina
21st-century African-American people